Carlin Craig Woodruff Jr., known by his stage name Carlos Morales, is a Filipino actor and director.

Personal life
Morales was born in Olongapo City, Philippines to Lilia and Carlin Woodruff and is the youngest of four children. His father was an American Navy serviceman previously based in Subic. When he was six years old, his parents separated and has since both remarried.

Morales attended high school at St. Joseph in Olongapo. He attended Centro Escolar University before transferring to San Sebastian College, where he finished his third year as a broadcasting major. He also attended Sacramento City College to study Nursing.

Career
Morales' performance in the Philippine Educational Theater Association play Mga Pusang Gala won him the lead role in the 2000 film Laro sa Baga. In the same year he appeared in the film Most Wanted and top-billed the horror flick Woman of Mud.

In 2008, Morales played the Incredible Hunk in the superhero comedy series Volta.

Piring, a film written and directed by Morales, won the Best Screenplay award and was dubbed second Best Picture in the 2nd World Premieres Film Festival in 2015.

Filmography

Television

Film

Awards and nominations

Theater

References

External links

Year of birth missing (living people)
That's Entertainment (Philippine TV series)
That's Entertainment Tuesday Group Members
Living people
Filipino male television actors
Filipino male film actors